Boldmere St. Michaels Women F.C. is an English football club based in Boldmere, Birmingham, who are currently members of the FA Women's National League North. They were promoted at the end of 2021-22 as Champions of Division One Midlands.

References

FA Women's National League North teams
Football clubs in Birmingham, West Midlands